The U.S.  has 210 census-designated places. The United States Census Bureau defines certain unincorporated communities as census-designated places (CDPs) for enumeration in each decennial census. The Census Bureau defined 187 CDPs in Colorado for the 2010 Census and 210 CDPs for the 2020 Census.

At the 2020 United States Census, 714,417 of the 5,773,714 Colorado residents (12.37%) lived in one of these 210 census-designated places. Another 4,299,942 residents (74.47%) lived in one of the 272 municipalities of the state, while the remaining 759,355 residents (13.15%) lived in the many rural and mountainous regions of the state.

Colorado CDPs range in population from the Highlands Ranch CDP with a 2020 population of 103,444 to the Fulford CDP which lost both of its residents before the 2020 Census. The Orchard Mesa CDP was the most densely populated CDP with a 2020 population density of 41,840 residents per square mile (16,155/km2), while the Cathedral CDP was the lease densely populated of the populated CDPs with 0.70 resident per square mile (0.27/km2).

Five Colorado CDPs extend into more than one county: the Brook Forest CDP, the Coal Creek CDP, the Columbine CDP, the Strasburg CDP, and the Watkins CDP.


Census-designated places

Census-designated places in multiple counties
The following table contains the 2020 population of each of the five census-designated places that currently extend into more than one Colorado county.

Population history
The Population history of Colorado census-designated places includes the population of the 210 census-designated places in Colorado since 2000 United States Census.

See also

List of populated places in Colorado
List of census-designated places in Colorado
Population history of Colorado census-designated places
List of counties in Colorado
List of county seats in Colorado
Population history of Colorado counties
List of forts in Colorado
List of ghost towns in Colorado
List of historic places in Colorado
List of municipalities in Colorado
Population history of Colorado municipalities
List of populated places in Colorado by county
List of post offices in Colorado
List of statistical areas in Colorado

Notes

References

External links

United States Department of Commerce
United States Census Bureau
State of Colorado
History Colorado

 
Lists of places in Colorado
Lists of populated places in Colorado
Colorado, List of census-designated places in
Colorado, List of census-designated places in